Sisters are female siblings.

Sisters or The Sisters may also refer to:

Places
 Sisters Islands (disambiguation), several island groups with the name
 Sisters, Oregon, a city in the United States
 The Sisters, Victoria, a settlement in Australia
 Sisters Creek (disambiguation)
 Sisters Olive Trees of Noah, an olive grove in Lebanon

Art
 The Sisters (Collinson), a 19th-century painting by James Collinson
 The Sisters (Thayer), an 1884 painting by Abbott Handerson Thayer

Film
 The Sisters (1914 film), an American film starring Lillian Gish
 Sisters (1922 film), an American drama film directed by Albert Capellani
 Sisters (1930 film), an American drama film directed by James Flood
 The Sisters (1938 film), featuring Bette Davis and Errol Flynn
 Sisters (1973 film), an American psychological horror directed by Brian de Palma
 The Sisters (1957 film), a Soviet film of 1957
 The Sisters (1969 film), a South Korean film starring Nam Jeong-im
 Sisters, a 1998 documentary by Fintan Connolly
 Sisters (2001 film), a Russian crime film
 The Sisters (2004 film), a Thai film
 Sisters (2005), also known as Hermanas, a drama film
 The Sisters (2005 film), an American film inspired by Anton Chekhov's play The Three Sisters
 Sisters (2006 film), a 2006 independent horror film
 The Sisters (2011 film), a 2011 Serbian film
 Sisters (2015 film), an American comedy film directed by Jason Moore

Literature
 The Sisters (play), a 1642 comedy by James Shirley
 "The Sisters" (short story), a 1904 story by James Joyce
 Sisters (Lynne Cheney novel), a 1981 novel by Lynne Cheney
 Sisters (Steel novel), a 2007 novel by Danielle Steel
 Sisters (graphic novel), a 2014 autobiographical graphic novel by Raina Telgemeier
 Sisters, the 1921–1922 first novel in the trilogy The Road to Calvary by Aleksey Nikolayevich Tolstoy

Music

Groups
 S!sters, a German vocal duo that represented Germany in the Eurovision Song Contest 2019
 The Sisters, an Indonesian vocal duo consisting of Shireen Sungkar and Zaskia Sungkar

Albums and EPs
 Sisters (Sister Sledge album), 1982
 Sisters (The Bluebells album), 1984
 Sisters (Sweethearts of the Rodeo album), 1992
 The Sisters EP, by Pulp, 1994
 Sisters (Idoling album), 2011

Songs
 "Sisters" (song), a 1954 song in the film White Christmas
 "Sisters", a song by Sparks from Pulling Rabbits Out of a Hat
 "Sisters", a song by Steve Vai from Passion and Warfare
 "The Sisters", a song by Renaissance from Novella

Television

Series
 Sisters (American TV series), a TV drama series which ran on NBC from 1991 to 1996
 Rod Santiago's The Sisters, a 2011 Philippine television drama
 Sisters (Australian TV series), 2017 Australian drama series

Episodes
 "Sisters" (Once Upon a Time), 2016
 "Sisters" (Roseanne), 1995
 "Sisters" (Teen Titans), 2003
 "The Sisters" (The Golden Girls), 2016

See also